The name Alicia has been used for a single tropical cyclone in the Atlantic Ocean.
Hurricane Alicia (1983) - a Category 3 hurricane that caused destruction to Texas, causing US$3 billion in damage.
Alicia was retired after the 1983 season and was replaced by Allison for the 1989 season.

The name Alicia has also been used for one tropical cyclone in the Southwest Indian Ocean.
Cyclone Alicia (2020)

Atlantic hurricane set index articles
South-West Indian Ocean cyclone set index articles